The 1985–86 West Virginia Mountaineers men's basketball team represented West Virginia University as a member of the Atlantic-10 Conference during the 1985–86 season. The team played their home games at WVU Coliseum in Morgantown, West Virginia. Led by 8th-year head coach Gale Catlett,  the Mountaineers finished tied for second in the conference regular season standings, and received an at-large bid to the 1986 NCAA Tournament as No. 9 seed in the East region.

Roster

Schedule and results

|-
!colspan=9 style=| Regular Season

|-
!colspan=9 style=| Atlantic-10 Tournament

|-
!colspan=9 style=| NCAA Tournament

Rankings

References

West Virginia
West Virginia Mountaineers men's basketball seasons
West Virginia Mountaineers men's basketball
West Virginia Mountaineers men's basketball
West Virginia